August G. Foreman (July 20, 1899 – February 13, 1953) was a relief pitcher in Major League Baseball who played between  and  for the Chicago White Sox (1924) and Boston Red Sox (1926). Listed at 5' 7", 160 lb., he batted and threw left-handed. He attended Chamberlain-Hunt Academy in Port Gibson, Mississippi.

Born in Memphis, Tennessee, Foreman was Jewish, and the last of 16 major leaguers nicknamed ″Happy″.

In a two-season career, Foreman posted a 3.18 ERA in six appearances, including four strikeouts, nine walks, three games finished, and 11⅓ innings of work. He did not have a decision.

Foreman died in New York, New York at the age of 55.

References

External links

1899 births
1953 deaths
Baseball players from Memphis, Tennessee
Beaumont Exporters players
Bloomington Bloomers players
Boston Red Sox players
Chicago White Sox players
Clarksdale Cubs players
Decatur Commodores players
Fort Worth Panthers players
Jewish American baseball players
Jewish Major League Baseball players
Major League Baseball pitchers
Shreveport Gassers players
20th-century American Jews
Burials at Beth David Cemetery